Perfect Man may refer to:

Film
 The Perfect Man (1939 film), a Hungarian film directed by Sándor Szlatinay
The Perfect Man (2005 film), an American film directed by Mark Rosman
The Perfect Man, a 2011 film featuring Elise Neal
A Perfect Man (2013 film), an American film directed by Kees Van Oostrum
A Perfect Man (2015 film), a French film directed by Yann Gozlan

Music
 Perfect Man (Rage album), or the title song, 1988
 Perfect Man (Shinhwa album), or the title song, 2002
 "Perfect Man", a song by Destiny's Child from Survivor
 "Perfect Man", a song by Rufus Wainwright from Out of the Game